Doon GAA club is a Gaelic Athletic Association club, founded in 1888. It is based in the village of Doon in County Limerick, Ireland. The club is part of the East Division of the Limerick GAA and has a tremendous record at underage level, but has yet to win a County Senior Hurling Championship. The club only plays hurling, but footballers in the parish play with neighbouring Oola. The manager is Austin Buckley.

Location
The club is located in the parish of Doon, mostly in County Limerick but also containing a few townlands in County Tipperary; these can play with the other club in the parish, Glengar, which is affiliated to the Tipperary GAA County Board. As Oola is only a football club, hurlers from the parish play with Doon. The club is roughly 30 km east of Limerick City. Bordering clubs include Cappamore, Pallasgreen and Doon's sister club Oola in Limerick, and Seán Treacy's, Cappawhite and Solohead in Tipperary.

History
The club was founded in 1888; it is one of the oldest clubs in the county. The club took part in competitions both in east Limerick and also in west Tipperary during the later years of the 19th century.

The club's senior hurling team defeated Ahane on Sunday 18 November 2007 in Caherconlish, to  become East Limerick Senior Hurling Champions, 2007. They once again received the  Sean Cunningham Cup. Doon have twice reached the final of the Limerick Senior Hurling Championship, losing to Ballybrown in 1989 and Patrickswell (by only one point) in 2000. In 1973 a Doon player, Willy Moore, was present in the Limerick team which beat Kilkenny to win the all-Ireland hurling final.
Doon GAA's under-21 team reached the final of the Limerick Under-21 Hurling Championship in 2004 and lost, but returned to the final in 2005 and beat Adare to take the championship for the first time. Doon's success at an underage level is outstanding, winning every county "A" title at each grade.

Current players
 Tommy Hayes 
 Adam English 
 Richie English - Limerick U-21 2015 and Current senior player
 Darragh O'Donovan - Limerick U-21 2015
 Denis "Dinny" Moloney (c)
 Barry Murphy - Limerick U-21 2017 
 Dean Coleman - Limerick U-21 2016
 Darragh Stapleton
 Pat Ryan - Limerick U-21 2015
 Mikey O'Brien

Grounds
The GAA pitch is located just off the main street on the Toher road. The grounds were opened in 1994 and dressing rooms were completed in 2002. The facilities include a full-sized pitch with nets behind each goal, an underage sized pitch with nets behind each goal, a covered stand, four dressing rooms and a hurling wall.

Honours
 Limerick Senior Hurling Championship Runners-Up (3): 1989, 2000, 2018, 2020
 Limerick Senior Hurling League (4): 1993, 2003, 2005, 2008
 Limerick Senior Hurling Cup (2): 1993, 2010
 Limerick Junior A Hurling Championship (2): 1937, 1941
 Limerick Junior A Hurling League (3): 2003, 2009, 2014
 Limerick Junior A Football Championship (1): 1928
 Limerick Junior B Hurling Championship (2): 1994, 2014
 Limerick Junior B Hurling League (4): 1994, 1995, 2009, 2014
 Limerick Under-21 Hurling Championship (7): 1966, 1967, 1982, 2005, 2019, 2020, 2021
 Limerick Minor Hurling Championship (12): 1946, 1959, 1965, 1967, 1970, 1976, 1979, 1995, 2003, 2012, 2013, 2015
 Limerick Under-16 Hurling Championship (3): 1977, 2001, 2017
 Limerick Under-15 Hurling Championship (1); 2010
 Limerick Under-14 Hurling Championship (3): 1976, 1977, 2009
 Limerick Under-14 Hurling Féile na nGael (4): 1977, 1999, 2000, 2009
 Limerick Under-14 Hurling League (4): 2000, 2001, 2002, 2009
 Limerick Under-12 Hurling Championship (1): 2007

Notable players
 Richie English
 Willie Moore
 Darragh O'Donovan
 PJ Richardson
 Pat Ryan
 Dinny Moloney
 Mike Fitzgerald
 Barry Murphy 
 Edmond stokes

External links
 Official Doon GAA Club Website
 Doon GAA Club News and Match Reports
 Doon GAA Club Results and Tables
 Doon GAA Club Roll of Honour
 Limerick county GAA website
 Doon GAA Pictures
 Tom O'Brien (1991). Doon G.A.A.: A History 1887-1990.
 Tom O'Brien (1980). Heroic Doon: A History of Doon G.A.A. Club.

Gaelic games clubs in County Limerick
Hurling clubs in County Limerick
Gaelic football clubs in County Limerick